Carl J. Peik (March 27, 1896 – December 2, 1993) was a member of the Wisconsin State Assembly.

Biography
Peik was born in Charlestown, Wisconsin. He attended high school in Chilton, Wisconsin before graduating from the University of Wisconsin-Madison in 1917. He died on December 2, 1993.

Career
Peik was a member of the Assembly from 1939 to 1940. Additionally, he was Supervisor of Charlestown from 1932 to 1939. He was a member of the Wisconsin Progressive Party.

References

People from Charlestown, Wisconsin
Wisconsin city council members
Members of the Wisconsin State Assembly
Wisconsin Progressives (1924)
University of Wisconsin–Madison alumni
1896 births
1993 deaths
20th-century American politicians